General Wood may also refer to:

Elliott Wood (1844–1931), British Army major general
Eric Fisher Wood (1888–1962), Pennsylvania National Guard general
Evelyn Wood (British Army officer) (1838–1919), British Army general
George Wood (British Army officer) (1898–1982), British Army major general
Henry Clay Wood (1832–1918), U.S. Army brigadier general
James Wood (New York politician) (1820–1892), Union Army brigadier general and brevet major general
James Wood (governor) (1741–1813), Virginia Militia brigadier general following the American Revolutionary War
Sir James Wood, 2nd Baronet (died 1738), British Army major general
John M. Wood (general) (1820–1892), New York Militia brigadier general and Union Army brevet major general
John Shirley Wood (1888–1966), U.S. Army major general
Leonard Wood (1860–1927), U.S. Army major general.
Robert E. Wood (1879–1969), U.S. Army brigadier general
Robert J. Wood (1905–1986), U.S. Army four-star general
S. A. M. Wood (1823–1891), Confederate States Army brigadier general
Thomas Wood (British Army officer) (1804–1872), British Army general
Thomas J. Wood (1823–1906), Union Army major general
William D. Wood (1822–1867), Union Army brigadier general
William H. Wood (American football) (1900–1988), U.S. Army brigadier general

See also
Minnie Hollow Wood (c. 1856–1930s), Lakota woman who earned the right to wear a war bonnet because of her valor in combat against the U.S. Cavalry at the Battle of Little Big Horn
General Woods (disambiguation)